The international monetary conferences were a series of assemblies held in the second half of the 19th century. They were held with a view to reaching agreement on matters relating to international relationships between national currency systems.

Background
The conferences were a manifestation of a decided tendency towards securing reforms by concerted international action. The disorganized state of the European currencies, which became more serious in consequence of the great expansion in trade and industry, came into notice through the great gold discoveries and their effect on the relative price of the two precious metals gold and silver. Both by its situation and its currency system, France was the first country to aim for the establishment of a currency union, in which French ideas and influence would be predominant. A preliminary step was the formation of the Latin Monetary Union, whereby the currencies of France, Italy, Belgium and Switzerland were – in respect to their gold and silver coins – unified.

First conference
The first international monetary conference was held in 1867 in Paris. The Paris Exhibition of 1867 furnished the occasion for summoning the conference, to which the principal countries of the world sent representatives. The guiding spirit of this assembly was the French statesman Félix Esquirou de Parieu, who had originated the Latin Monetary Union.
By his advice a scheme was approved recommending the adoption of the single gold standard, decimalisation of currencies, and the coordination of the various currencies with the French currency system.

Difficulties as to the mode of bringing these principles into practical operation were discussed, and full liberty had to be given to the several nations to carry out the proposals in the way that seemed best. The result proved that the obstacles were insurmountable, for example the British government could not obtain the assent of a Royal Commission to the pegging of the sovereign to the 25-franc piece, and the course of political events soon completely altered the relative position of the leading countries, even in their monetary relations. Germany and the United States reformed their currencies, without reference to any international considerations.

Second conference
The second conference opened on August 10, 1878 in Paris. Leon Say was the president of the conference.

A great fall in the relative price of silver as measured in gold, in progress since 1873, had affected the relations of silver-using countries, and disturbed the level of prices. Indian interests as well as those of United States producers of silver suffered, while the management of all double-standard currencies became a task of increasing difficulty. The government of the United States invited the representatives of the leading powers to meet in Paris for the purpose of considering: first the desirability of retaining the unrestricted use of silver for coinage, and second the adoption of international bimetallism, by the acceptance of a ratio to be fixed by agreement.

Eleven nations sent delegates, Germany being the only great power unrepresented. After somewhat protracted discussion and the presentation of a large number of documents, the European states accepted the United States' proposition “that it is necessary to maintain in the world the monetary functions of silver,” but declined to bind the discretion of particular states as to the methods to be employed. They further declared it impossible to enter into an agreement for a common ratio. The conference, therefore, separated without any result being obtained.

Third conference
A third conference was opened on April 19, 1881 in Paris. Negotiations lasted until July 1881, failing to achieve a cooperative outcome.

In consequence of the continuing fall in the value of silver, this conference was convened by the joint action of France and the United States. It was more influential than the second conference since Germany sent representatives, as did Spain, Portugal, Denmark and India. The characteristic of this conference was the greater strength of the support given to the bimetallic proposal by France and the United States, together with the opposition of the delegates of the smaller European countries, and the refusal of Germany to promise any cooperation. The inevitable consequence of this situation was the adjournment of the conference to obtain fresh instructions, which, however, were never furnished.

Fourth conference
After several abortive attempts, the fourth (and last) of the monetary conferences of this group was brought together at Brussels in November 1892 on the initiative of the United States. A full representation of the powers attended, but delay arose from the absence of definite proposals by the United States government. These, when they were presented, proved to be only a reaffirmation of the bimetallic policy, and showed no advance. The conference, therefore, proceeded to consider the plans of Levy, Baron de Rothschild and Sotbeer for the more extended use of silver. Such devices, being merely alleviations, failed to gain any effective support. Appeals to England and Germany to grant some concessions likewise failed. Thus, like its Paris forerunners, the Brussels conference adjourned, but never resumed its sittings.

After 1892, the currency problem passed into a new stage in which action was national rather than international. The method of procedure by conference was abandoned for some time.

Notes

References
  This work in turn cites:
.

19th-century economic history
Gold standard
History of international trade
Global economic conferences
19th-century diplomatic conferences
1867 in international relations
1878 in international relations
1881 in international relations
1892 in international relations
1867 conferences
1878 conferences
1881 conferences
1892 conferences